Saiful Ridzuan bin Selamat (born 16 March 1992 in Kuala Lumpur) is a Malaysian footballer who plays for Negeri Sembilan.

Club career

Selangor FA
Saiful made his name with Harimau Muda A however briefly played for a year with UiTM FC. In the same year he also represented Selangor for the football event during the Sukma Games in Pahang. Playing as a midfielder, he signed with Selangor in 2015 after being released by Harimau Muda A.

Melaka United

On 1 December 2018, Saiful switched sides and joined Melaka United for a free transfer after his contract with Selangor become expires.

Negeri Sembilan FC 
In 2021 he joined the team Negeri Sembilan FC on a free transfer. Has been with the team for two years and has become a key player throughout 2022. He has helped the team secure fourth place in the Malaysia Super League in 2022. It is an impressive achievement as the team has just been promoted from the Malaysia Premier League in the previous year and had shocked the other Malaysia Super League teams as Negeri Sembilan FC was considered an underdog team. He has made 37 appearances during his time with Negeri Sembilan FC.

Career statistics

Club

1 Includes AFC Cup and AFC Champions League.

Honours

Club
Selangor
 Malaysia Cup: 2015

References

External links
 

Malaysian footballers
UiTM FC players
Selangor FA players
Sportspeople from Kuala Lumpur
Negeri Sembilan FA players
Negeri Sembilan FC players
1992 births
Living people
Malaysia Super League players
Association football midfielders
Malaysian people of Malay descent
Footballers at the 2014 Asian Games
Melaka United F.C. players
Asian Games competitors for Malaysia